Cesare Gelli (28 November 1932 – 27 August 2016) was an Italian actor and voice actor.

Life and career 
Born in Rome, Gelli started his career as part of several theatrical companies, and later acting in some RAI radio and television dramas. He made his film debut in 1962, with a minor role in Luciano Salce's A Girl... and a Million.

Mainly cast in supporting roles, Gelli was specialised in roles of high-rank politicians and professionals. He played Cimosco in several theatrical editions of Orlando Furioso directed by Luca Ronconi, and Don Nicolò Paritelli in three editions of Rugantino.

Filmography

References

External links 

1932 births
2016 deaths
Male actors from Rome
Italian male stage actors
Italian male film actors
Italian male television actors
Italian male voice actors
20th-century Italian male actors